The 2010–11 season was the 96th season of the Isthmian League, which is an English football competition featuring semi-professional and amateur clubs from London, East and South East England.

Premier Division

The Premier Division consisted of 22 clubs, including 17 clubs from the previous season, and five new clubs:
 Bury Town, promoted and transferred as champions of Southern Football League Division One Midlands
 Concord Rangers, promoted as play-off winners in Division One North
 Croydon Athletic, promoted as champions of Division One South
 Folkestone Invicta, promoted as play-off winners in Division One South
 Lowestoft Town, promoted as champions of Division One North

Sutton United won the division and were promoted back to the Conference South at the third attempt after two play-off defeats, along with play-off winners Tonbridge Angels. Maidstone United, Croydon Athletic, and Folkestone Invicta were relegated while Aveley were reprieved due to Rushden & Diamonds and Ilkeston Town folding in the Football Conference.

League table

Top scorers

Play-offs

Semi-finals

Final

Results grid

Stadia and locations

Division One North

Division One North consisted of 22 clubs, including 18 clubs from the previous season, and four new clubs:
 AFC Sudbury, transferred from Southern Football League Division One Central
 Grays Athletic, relegated from the Conference Premier and took voluntary demotion to this level
 Needham Market, promoted as champions of the Eastern Counties League
 Waltham Abbey, relegated from the Premier Division

Leyton withdrew from Division One North on 14 January 2011, but expressed a wish to retain a team in the Youth League. At a meeting on 20 February this proposal was rejected and the club was expelled from the League. The club's record of P19 W1 D6 L12 GF13 GA45 Pts9 was expunged on 24 February.

East Thurrock United won the division and were promoted back to the Premier Division after two seasons of absence along with play-off winners Wingate & Finchley. Waltham Forest were reprieved due to clubs folding higher up the pyramid, so no teams were relegated from the division this season.

League table

Top scorers

Play-offs

Semi-finals

Final

Results grid

Stadia and locations

Division One South

Division One South consisted of 22 clubs, including 19 clubs from the previous season, and three new clubs:
 Bognor Regis Town, relegated from the Premier Division
 Faversham Town, promoted as champions of the Kent League
 Whitehawk, promoted as champions of the Sussex County League

Metropolitan Police won the division and were promoted to the Premier Division along with play-off winners Leatherhead. Bognor Regis Town missed out on the title by a single goal after a draw against Chatham Town on the final day of the season. The draw was not enough for Chatham Town to escape the relegation zone although they were later reprieved due to clubs folding higher up the pyramid. So, Horsham YMCA were the only club relegated from the Isthmian League this season.

League table

Top scorers

Play-offs

Semi-finals

Final

Results grid

Stadia and locations

League Cup

The Isthmian League Cup 2010–11 (billed as the Championship Manager Cup 2010–11 for sponsorship reasons) is the 37th season of the Isthmian League Cup, the cup competition of the whole Isthmian League. Sixty-six clubs took part.

Calendar

First round
Four clubs from division Ones participated in the first round, while all other clubs received a bye to the second round.

Second round
The two clubs to have made it through the first round were entered into the draw with every other Isthmian League club, making sixty-four teams.

Third round

Fourth round

Quarterfinals

Semifinals

Final

See also
Isthmian League
2010–11 Northern Premier League
2010–11 Southern Football League

References

External links
Official website

Isthmian League seasons
7